This is a list of the mammal species recorded in Chile. As of January 2011, there are 152 mammal species listed for Chile, of which four are critically endangered, eight are endangered, eight are vulnerable, and eleven are near threatened.

The following tags are used to highlight each species' conservation status as assessed by the International Union for Conservation of Nature; those on the left are used here, those in the second column are used in some other articles:

Subclass: Theria

Infraclass: Metatheria

Superorder: Ameridelphia

Order: Didelphimorphia (common opossums)

Didelphimorphia is the order of common opossums of the Western Hemisphere. Opossums probably diverged from the basic South American marsupials in the late Cretaceous or early Paleocene. They are small to medium-sized marsupials, about the size of a large house cat, with a long snout and prehensile tail.

Family: Didelphidae (American opossums)
Subfamily: Didelphinae
Genus: Thylamys
 Elegant fat-tailed mouse opossum, Thylamys elegans LC
 White-bellied fat-tailed mouse opossum, Thylamys pallidior LC

Order: Paucituberculata (shrew opossums)

There are six extant species of shrew opossum. They are small shrew-like marsupials confined to the Andes.

Family: Caenolestidae
Genus: Rhyncholestes
 Long-nosed caenolestid, R. raphanurus

Superorder: Australidelphia

Order: Microbiotheria (monito del monte)

The monito del monte is the only extant member of its family and the only surviving member of an ancient order, Microbiotheria. It appears to be more closely related to Australian marsupials than to other Neotropic marsupials; this is a reflection of the South American origin of all Australasian marsupials.

Family: Microbiotheriidae
Genus: Dromiciops
 Monito del monte, D. gliroides

Infraclass: Eutheria

Superorder: Xenarthra

Order: Cingulata (armadillos)

Armadillos are small mammals with a bony armored shell. There are 21 extant species in the Americas, 19 of which are only found in South America, where they originated. Their much larger relatives, the pampatheres and glyptodonts, once lived in North and South America but became extinct following the appearance of humans.

Family: Chlamyphoridae (armadillos)
Subfamily: Euphractinae
Genus: Chaetophractus
 Andean hairy armadillo, Chaetophractus nationi VU
 Big hairy armadillo, Chaetophractus villosus LC
Genus: Zaedyus
 Pichi, Zaedyus pichiy NT

Superorder: Euarchontoglires

Order: Rodentia (rodents)

Rodents make up the largest order of mammals, with over 40% of mammalian species. They have two incisors in the upper and lower jaw which grow continually and must be kept short by gnawing.

Suborder: Hystricognathi
Family: Chinchillidae (viscachas and chinchillas)
Genus: Chinchilla
 Short-tailed chinchilla, Chinchilla brevicaudata CR
 Long-tailed chinchilla, Chinchilla lanigera CR
Genus: Lagidium
 Southern viscacha, Lagidium viscacia LC
 Northern viscacha, Lagidium peruanum LC
 Wolffsohn's viscacha, Lagidium wolffsohni DD
Family: Caviidae (guinea pigs)
Subfamily: Caviinae
Genus: Cavia
 Montane guinea pig, Cavia tschudii LC
Genus: Galea
 Common yellow-toothed cavy, Galea musteloides LC
Genus: Microcavia
 Southern mountain cavy, Microcavia australis LC
 Andean mountain cavy, Microcavia niata LC
Family: Ctenomyidae
Genus: Ctenomys
 Coyhaique tuco-tuco, Ctenomys coyhaiquensis DD
 Tawny tuco-tuco, Ctenomys fulvus LC
 Magellanic tuco-tuco, Ctenomys magellanicus VU
 Maule tuco-tuco, Ctenomys maulinus LC
 Highland tuco-tuco, Ctenomys opimus LC
Family: Octodontidae
Genus: Aconaemys
 Chilean rock rat, Aconaemys fuscus LC
 Porter's rock rat, Aconaemys porteri DD
 Sage's rock rat, Aconaemys sagei DD
Genus: Octodon
 Bridges's degu, Octodon bridgesi VU
 Common degu, Octodon degus LC
 Moon-toothed degu, Octodon lunatus NT
 Pacific degu, Octodon pacificus CR
Genus: Octodontomys
 Mountain degu, Octodontomys gliroides LC
Genus: Spalacopus
 Coruro, Spalacopus cyanus LC
Family: Abrocomidae
Genus: Abrocoma
 Bennett's chinchilla rat, Abrocoma bennettii LC
 Ashy chinchilla rat, Abrocoma cinerea LC
Family: Myocastoridae (coypus)
Genus: Myocastor
 Coypu, Myocastor coypus LC

Suborder: Sciurognathi
Family: Cricetidae
Subfamily: Sigmodontinae
Genus: Abrothrix
 Andean Altiplano mouse, Abrothrix andinus LC
 Hershkovitz's grass mouse, Abrothrix hershkovitzi LC
 Woolly grass mouse, Abrothrix lanosus LC
 Long-haired grass mouse, Abrothrix longipilis LC
 Olive grass mouse, Abrothrix olivaceus LC
 Sanborn's grass mouse, Abrothrix sanborni NT
Genus: Akodon
 White-bellied grass mouse, Akodon albiventer LC
 Bolivian grass mouse, Akodon boliviensis LC
 Intelligent grass mouse, Akodon iniscatus LC
Genus: Andinomys
 Andean mouse, Andinomys edax LC
Genus: Auliscomys
 Bolivian big-eared mouse, Auliscomys boliviensis LC
 Painted big-eared mouse, Auliscomys pictus LC
 Andean big-eared mouse, Auliscomys sublimis LC
Genus: Calomys
 Andean vesper mouse, Calomys lepidus LC
Genus: Chelemys
 Magellanic long-clawed akodont, Chelemys delfini DD
 Andean long-clawed mouse, Chelemys macronyx LC
 Large long-clawed mouse, Chelemys megalonyx NT
Genus: Chinchillula
 Altiplano chinchilla mouse, Chinchillula sahamae LC
Genus: Eligmodontia
 Morgan's gerbil mouse, Eligmodontia morgani LC
 Andean gerbil mouse, Eligmodontia puerulus LC
Genus: Euneomys
 Patagonian chinchilla mouse, Euneomys chinchilloides DD
 Biting chinchilla mouse, Euneomys mordax LC
 Peterson's chinchilla mouse, Euneomys petersoni LC
Genus: Galenomys
 Garlepp's mouse, Galenomys garleppi DD
Genus: Geoxus
 Long-clawed mole mouse, Geoxus valdivianus LC
Genus: Irenomys
 Chilean climbing mouse, Irenomys tarsalis LC
Genus: Loxodontomys
 Southern big-eared mouse, Loxodontomys micropus LC
 Pikumche pericote, Loxodontomys pikumche LC
Genus: Neotomys
 Andean swamp rat, Neotomys ebriosus LC
Genus: Oligoryzomys
 Long-tailed pygmy rice rat, Oligoryzomys longicaudatus LC
 Magellanic pygmy rice rat, Oligoryzomys magellanicus LC
Genus: Pearsonomys
 Pearson's long-clawed akodont, Pearsonomys annectens VU
Genus: Phyllotis
 Darwin's leaf-eared mouse, Phyllotis darwini LC
 Lima leaf-eared mouse, Phyllotis limatus LC
 Master leaf-eared mouse, Phyllotis magister LC
 Osgood's leaf-eared mouse, Phyllotis osgoodi DD
 Yellow-rumped leaf-eared mouse, Phyllotis xanthopygus LC
Genus: Reithrodon
 Bunny rat, Reithrodon auritus LC
Family: Muridae (mice, rats, voles, gerbils, hamsters, etc.)
Subfamily: Murinae
Genus: Rattus
 Polynesian rat, Rattus exulans LC

Superorder: Laurasiatheria

Order: Chiroptera (bats)

The bats' most distinguishing feature is that their forelimbs are developed as wings, making them the only mammals capable of flight. Bat species account for about 20% of all mammals.

Family: Vespertilionidae
Subfamily: Myotinae
Genus: Myotis
 Atacama myotis, Myotis atacamensis NT
 Chilean myotis, Myotis chiloensis LC
Subfamily: Vespertilioninae
Genus: Histiotus
 Big-eared brown bat, Histiotus macrotus LC
 Southern big-eared brown bat, Histiotus magellanicus] LC
 Small big-eared brown bat, Histiotus montanus LC
Genus: Lasiurus
 Desert red bat, Lasiurus blossevillii LC
 Hoary bat, Lasiurus cinereus LC
 Cinnamon red bat, Lasiurus varius LC
Family: Molossidae
Genus: Eumops
 Western mastiff bat, Eumops perotis LC
Genus: Mormopterus
 Kalinowski's mastiff bat, Mormopterus kalinowskii LC
Genus: Tadarida
 Mexican free-tailed bat, Tadarida brasiliensis LC
Family: Phyllostomidae
Subfamily: Stenodermatinae
Genus: Sturnira
 Little yellow-shouldered bat, Sturnira lilium LC
Subfamily: Desmodontinae
Genus: Desmodus
 Common vampire bat, Desmodus rotundus LC
Family: Furipteridae
Genus: Amorphochilus
 Smoky bat, Amorphochilus schnablii EN

Order: Carnivora (carnivorans)

There are over 260 species of carnivorans, the majority of which feed primarily on meat. They have a characteristic skull shape and dentition.

Suborder: Feliformia
Family: Felidae (cats)
Subfamily: Felinae
Genus: Leopardus
Pampas cat L. colocola 
Geoffroy's cat L. geoffroyi 
Kodkod, L. guigna 
Andean mountain cat L. jacobitus 
Genus: Puma
Cougar, P. concolor 
Suborder: Caniformia
Family: Canidae (dogs, foxes)
Genus: Dusicyon
 Dusicyon avus 
Genus: Lycalopex
 Culpeo, Lycalopex culpaeus LC
 Darwin's fox, Lycalopex fulvipes CR
 South American gray fox, Lycalopex griseus LC
Family: Procyonidae (raccoons)
Genus: Nasua
 South American coati, Nasua nasua LC introduced
Family: Mustelidae, (mustelids)
Genus: Galictis
 Lesser grison, Galictis cuja LC
Genus: Lyncodon
 Patagonian weasel, Lyncodon patagonicus LC
Genus: Lontra
 Marine otter, Lontra felina EN
 Southern river otter, Lontra provocax EN
Genus: Neogale
 American mink, N. vison LC introduced
Family: Mephitidae
Genus: Conepatus
 Molina's hog-nosed skunk, Conepatus chinga LC
 Humboldt's hog-nosed skunk, Conepatus humboldtii LC
Clade: Pinnipedia (seals, sea lions and walruses)
Family: Otariidae (eared seals, sea lions)
Genus: Arctocephalus
 South American fur seal, Arctocephalus australis LC
 Antarctic fur seal, Arctocephalus gazella LC
 Juan Fernandez fur seal, Arctocephalus philippii NT
 Subantarctic fur seal, Arctocephalus tropicalis LC
Genus: Otaria
 South American sea lion, Otaria flavescens LC
Family: Phocidae, (earless seals)
Genus: Hydrurga
 Leopard seal, Hydrurga leptonyx LC
Genus: Mirounga
 Southern elephant seal, Mirounga leonina LC

Order: Artiodactyla (even-toed ungulates and cetaceans)

The weight of even-toed ungulates is borne about equally by the third and fourth toes, rather than mostly or entirely by the third as in perissodactyls. There are about 220 noncetacean artiodactyl species, including many that are of great economic importance to humans.

Family: Camelidae (camels, llamas)
Genus: Lama
 Guanaco, L. guanicoe LC
 Vicuña, L. vicugna LC
Family: Cervidae (deer)
Subfamily: Capreolinae
Genus: Hippocamelus
 Taruca, Hippocamelus antisensis VU
 South Andean deer, Hippocamelus bisulcus EN
Genus: Pudu
 Southern pudú, Pudu puda VU
Subfamily: Cervinae
Genus: Dama
 European fallow deer, D. dama LC introduced

Infraorder: Cetacea (whales, dolphins and porpoises)

The infraorder Cetacea includes whales, dolphins and porpoises. They are the mammals most fully adapted to aquatic life with a spindle-shaped nearly hairless body, protected by a thick layer of blubber, and forelimbs and tail modified to provide propulsion underwater. Their closest extant relatives are the hippos, which are artiodactyls, from which cetaceans descended; cetaceans are thus also artiodactyls.

Parvorder: Mysticeti
Family: Balaenidae
Genus: Eubalaena
 Southern right whale, Eubalaena australis LC
Family: Balaenopteridae
Subfamily: Balaenopterinae
Genus: Balaenoptera
 Common minke whale, Balaenoptera acutorostrata LC
 Antarctic minke whale, Balaenoptera bonaerensis NT
 Sei whale, Balaenoptera borealis EN
 Bryde's whale, Balaenoptera edeni DD
 Blue whale, Balaenoptera musculus EN
 Fin whale, Balaenoptera physalus VU
Subfamily: Megapterinae
Genus: Megaptera
 Humpback whale, Megaptera novaeangliae LC
Family: Neobalaenidae
Genus: Caperea
 Pygmy right whale, Caperea marginata LC
Parvorder: Odontoceti
Family: Physeteridae
Genus: Physeter
 Sperm whale, Physeter macrocephalus VU
Family: Kogiidae
Genus: Kogia
 Pygmy sperm whale, Kogia breviceps DD
 Dwarf sperm whale, Kogia sima DD
Family: Ziphidae
Genus: Ziphius
 Cuvier's beaked whale, Ziphius cavirostris LC
Genus: Berardius
 Arnoux's beaked whale, Berardius arnuxii DD
Genus: Tasmacetus
 Shepherd's beaked whale, Tasmacetus shepherdi DD
Subfamily: Hyperoodontinae
Genus: Hyperoodon
 Southern bottlenose whale, Hyperoodon planifrons LC
Genus: Mesoplodon
 Blainville's beaked whale, Mesoplodon densirostris DD
 Ginkgo-toothed beaked whale, Mesoplodon ginkgodens DD
 Gray's beaked whale, Mesoplodon grayi DD
 Hector's beaked whale, Mesoplodon hectori DD
 Strap-toothed whale, Mesoplodon layardii DD
 Spade-toothed whale, Mesoplodon traversii DD
Superfamily: Delphinoidea
Family: Phocoenidae (porpoises) LC
Genus: Phocoena
 Spectacled porpoise, Phocoena dioptrica LC
 Burmeister's porpoise, Phocoena spinipinnis NT
Family: Delphinidae (marine dolphins)
Genus: Cephalorhynchus
 Commerson's dolphin, Cephalorhynchus commersonii LC
 Chilean dolphin, Cephalorhynchus eutropia NT
Genus: Steno
 Rough-toothed dolphin, Steno bredanensis LC
Genus: Tursiops
 Common bottlenose dolphin, Tursiops truncatus LC
Genus: Stenella
 Spinner dolphin, Stenella longirostris LC
Genus: Delphinus
 Long-beaked common dolphin, Delphinus capensis DD
 Short-beaked common dolphin, Delphinus delphis LC
Genus: Lagenorhynchus
 Peale's dolphin, Lagenorhynchus australis DD
 Hourglass dolphin, Lagenorhynchus cruciger LC
 Dusky dolphin, Lagenorhynchus obscurus DD
Genus: Lissodelphis
 Southern right whale dolphin, Lissodelphis peronii LC
Genus: Grampus
 Risso's dolphin, Grampus griseus LC
Genus: Orcinus
 Orca, Orcinus orca DD
Genus: Pseudorca
 False killer whale, Pseudorca crassidens NT
Genus: Globicephala
 Long-finned pilot whale, Globicephala melas LC

See also
Wildlife in Chile
List of mammals in Antarctica
Lists of mammals by region
List of prehistoric mammals
Mammal classification
List of mammals described in the 2000s

Notes

References

External links

+
Chile
Mammals
Chile